The Arado E.654 was a German heavy fighter project by Arado Flugzeugwerke.

Design
The E.654 used a widened variant on the fuselage of the Arado Ar 240 so that it could mount two DB 614 or DB 627 engines inside the fuselage, similar to the Arado E.561. It had a single vertical tailfin with a tailplane. Like the E.561, it was abandoned due to technical issues with the transmission to the wings. It used straight wings with tapering on leading and trailing edges. It used three wheels with a tricycle arrangement, all of which could retract into their specific parts of the aircraft. The cockpit was located between the nose, and had two crew members sitting back-to-back.

Specifications

References

Arado aircraft
Fighter aircraft